Kitogani is a village on the Tanzanian island of Unguja, part of Zanzibar in the continent of Africa. It is located in the southeast of the island, two kilometres south of Jozani.

References
Finke, J. (2006) The Rough Guide to Zanzibar (2nd edition). New York: Rough Guides.

Villages in Zanzibar